The Princess and the Goblin is a 1991 Welsh-Hungarian-American animated fantasy film directed by József Gémes and written by Robin Lyons, an adaptation of George MacDonald's 1872 novel of the same name.

When a peaceful kingdom is menaced by an army of monstrous goblins, a brave and beautiful princess joins forces with a resourceful peasant boy to rescue the noble king and all his people. The lucky pair must battle the evil power of the wicked goblin prince armed only with the gift of song, the miracle of love, and a magical shimmering thread.

Plot 
In a mountainous kingdom, the widowed King leaves to attend affairs of state, leaving his beloved daughter, the sweet Princess Irene, alone with her nursemaid, Lootie. When Irene is on an outing with Lootie, she runs away on purpose, and Lootie cannot find her. When sun sets, Irene is lost in a sinister forest, and is attacked when clawed hands bursts through the earth and attempts to seize her kitten, Turnip. Several deformed animals corner the frightened Princess, until a strange singing sounds through the trees, driving them into a crazed and frightened fit, and they flee. The singing is revealed to be a young boy, Curdie, the son of a miner. He discovers that Irene is lost, and leads her back to the castle. He informs her that the monsters were goblins and their "pets", and that they are driven away by singing. Curdie says that everyone except the King and his family know of the goblins, and Irene reveals that she is a Princess.

The next day, Irene goes exploring in the castle after discovering a magical secret door in her bedroom. She ventures into a tower and meets the spirit of her Great-Great-Grandmother, also called Irene. Grandmother informs the young princess that she will be there to help her, for Irene will soon be in grave danger. The same day, Curdie and his father are underground in the mines, and Curdie falls through a pothole and into the realm of the goblins. Hidden, he follows the goblins to a vast cavern where the sniveling Goblin King and the malevolent Goblin Queen are holding an audience, announcing their scheme to flood the mines and drown the "Sun People"... humans. Suddenly, Prince Froglip, the feared, yet spoiled and infantile, heir to the goblin throne, announces that drowning them is "Not enough!" and states that he shall abduct the Princess of the Sun People and marry her, thereby forcing the humans to accept the goblins as their rulers. He claims that this is revenge for the humans exiling the goblins underground centuries beforehand. Before Curdie can run and tell the others, the goblins find him and put him away in a dungeon. Luckily, Irene and Turnip have snuck out of the castle again, following a magic thread given to her by her grandmother, invisible to everyone else. The thread leads Irene to Curdie and working together, Curdie is released from his improvised cell. The two children are chased by the goblins but luckily escape. The miners are warned of the flooding plan in time to begin erecting supports to keep most of the tunnels free of water and the castle is also put on guard. The goblins do attack and Curdie must show all the castle people how to fight – namely, to jump on the goblins' feet and sing. Curdie also realizes that if the miners are successful, the water will have nowhere to go but up and end up flooding the castle. He tries to get everyone to leave and he and the king realize that Irene is missing. Curdie finds Irene being held captive by the evil Froglip. All three are knocked down by the arrival of the flood waters and Curdie tries to rescue the princess and not get thrown over the battlement edges by the goblin prince. With some help from Irene, Froglip is flung away and everyone is saved.

Cast 
 Sally Ann Marsh – Princess Irene, the sweet and courageous princess of the castle.
 Peter Murray – Curdie, a mining warrior boy (Paul Keating did his singing voice).
 Rik Mayall – Prince Froglip, the evil Goblin Prince.
 Claire Bloom – Great-Great-Grandmother Irene.
 Joss Ackland – King Papa, Irene's father.
 William Hootkins – Peter, Curdie's father.
 Roy Kinnear – Mump. This was Kinnear's final screen role released, following his death on September 20, 1988.
 Robin Lyons – Goblin King, Froglip's father.
 Peggy Mount – Goblin Queen, Froglip's mother. This was Mount's final film role.
 Victor Spinetti – Glump.
 Mollie Sugden – Lootie, Irene's nanny.

Production 
The Princess and the Goblin was the first animated feature from Wales, and the 25th full-length cartoon from Hungary. The film was produced by the Welsh television station S4C, and the Cardiff-based Siriol studio, along with Hungary's Pannonia and Japan's NHK. Costing $10 million, the film teamed producer/screenwriter Robin Lyons with director József Gémes (from 1975's Hugo the Hippo, 1982's Heroic Times and 1988's Willy the Sparrow). Most of the principal animation was produced at the Siriol facilities.

Release 
Originally released in 1992 and 1993 across Europe, The Princess and the Goblin was picked up for North American release by Hemdale Communications for a summer release in 1994. The film was a critical and commercial failure there, only grossing US$2.1 million from 795 venues, being overshadowed by the release of The Lion King. Coincidentally, this film's star Rik Mayall had been asked by Tim Rice to audition for The Lion King for the roles of Banzai, Zazu and Timon.

Reception 
Halliwell's Film Guide deemed it an "Uninteresting animated feature, with a dull fairy-tale plot dully executed." The New York Times wrote "If 'The Princess and the Goblin' is mildly diverting children's fare, its characters are not sharply focused visually or verbally. In a cinema that teems with terrifying monsters, the goblins appear to be ineffectual and unmenacing even when they are on the warpath."

Rita Kempley of the Washington Post wrote that the movie set a standard as far beneath that of Aladdin.

In a desperate attempt to counter its bad reviews, Hemdale asked several movie critics to view the film with their children and asked those children for their comments on the film; these were subsequently included in its newspaper promotion. Mentioned in the advertisements were Michael Medved's daughter, Sarah, and Bob Campbell's four-year-old daughter ("It gets 91 stars!"). The idea came from Hemdale executives who thought animated films from the Disney company were preferred over those from other studios.

The Princess and the Goblin received a Seal of Approval from the Dove Foundation, and the Film Advisory Board's Award of Excellence. It also won the Best Children's Film Award at the Fort Lauderdale International Film Festival.

Home media 
Hemdale Home Video premiered the movie on VHS sometime after its theatrical outing. It was released on DVD on 15 August 2005 by Allumination FilmWorks.

See also 
 List of animated feature-length films
 List of Welsh films
 List of American films
 The Last Unicorn – a 1982 animated film
 The Black Cauldron – a 1985 animated Disney film
 The Thief and the Cobbler – a 1993 animated film
 Quest for Camelot – a 1998 animated Warner Bros. film

References

External links 
 
 
 
 

1991 films
1992 films
1994 films
1991 animated films
1992 animated films
1994 animated films
British animated films
British animated fantasy films
British fantasy adventure films
British children's films
Hungarian children's films
1990s children's fantasy films
Animated films based on children's books
Hungarian independent films
Films set in castles
Films set in the Middle Ages
Fictional princesses
Fictional princes
Films based on British novels
George MacDonald
1990s children's films
Animated films based on novels
1990s fantasy adventure films
1990s children's animated films
Hungarian animated films
1990s British films